Archduchess Maria Anna Eleonore Wilhelmine Josepha of Austria (18 September 1718 in Vienna – 16 December 1744 in Brussels) was a member of the House of Habsburg who governed the Austrian Netherlands in the name of her elder sister, Empress Maria Theresa.

Life 
Maria Anna was born at the Hofburg Imperial Palace in Vienna. Her birth was not well received by her father. She and her sister Maria Theresa were the only children of Charles VI, Holy Roman Emperor, and Elisabeth Christine of Brunswick to survive into adulthood. The two sisters were raised in the Imperial Court (Kaiserhof) in Vienna. During her youth she met her future brother in law, Francis Stephen of Lorraine and his younger brother Charles Alexander of Lorraine. The two princes were staying in Austria having a good education; their mother Élisabeth Charlotte d'Orléans was in France.

In 1725, negotiations with the Queen of Spain, Elisabeth Farnese had Maria Anna as a possible wife of Philip, Duke of Parma, who was just five. This match was supposed to smooth over relations with Spain. An alliance of Spain and Austria was signed on 30 April 1725 and thus guaranteed the Pragmatic Sanction of the Habsburgs [allowing Maria Theresa right of her father's lands being his eldest daughter], which was first declared in 1713. Based on the terms of the treaty, the Austrian Empire relinquished all claims to the Spanish throne. It also agreed that Spain would invade Gibraltar with the help of the Austrians. Despite this, the Anglo-Spanish War stopped the ambitions of Elisabeth of Parma and with the signing of the Treaty of Seville (9 November 1729) saw the abandonment of the Austro-Spanish marriage plans.

She fell in love with Charles Alexander of Lorraine, the younger brother of Maria Theresa's husband, Francis Stephen. There was considerable resistance to their marriage, not least the wish of her father for a politically more important son-in-law.

Maria Anna's husband-to-be was a half-second-cousin-once-removed, being a third generation descendant of Ferdinand III, Holy Roman Emperor, through two of Ferdinand III's children, Leopold I, Holy Roman Emperor and his half-sister Eleonora Maria of Austria.

Governor of the Austrian Netherlands 
It was only after their father's death that Empress Elisabeth Christine gave the approval for the marriage, which was concluded in St Augustine's Church (Augustinerkirche) in Vienna on 7 January 1744. The marriage was recognised by Letters Patent signed on 8 January.

Weeks after the marriage, the couple was appointed governors of the Austrian Netherlands in succession of their aunt Archduchess Maria Elisabeth of Austria, who had died in 1741. The couple left Vienna on 3 February and arrived in Wuustwezel, a town in the Austrian Netherlands, on 24 March where they were met by Count Karl Ferdinand von Königsegg-Erps. Karl Ferdinand was a member of the Supreme council of the Netherlands and had to receive Prince Charles and Maria Anna due to etiquette. Their arrival was greeted with much celebration. A ceremony had been organised for their arrival; this included a Te Deum and a collection of balls and banquets.

The couple only had two months of time together in the Netherlands, as Charles had to leave to participate in the war against Prussia, while Maria Anna, pregnant with their first child, remained in Brussels. Charles left officially on 4 May. 

While alone in Brussels, Maria Anna was assisted in governing by the Austrian statesman Count Wenzel Anton von Kaunitz-Rietberg.

Death 
On 16 December 1744 Maria Anna went into labour and gave birth to a stillborn son; she never recovered and died later that same day due to the difficult childbirth. She and her son were buried in the Imperial Crypt in Vienna. Charles Alexander never remarried, and would remain the governor until his death in 1780. He was a very popular governor and died in Brussels like his wife.

Ancestry

References 

1718 births
1744 deaths
Deaths in childbirth
Nobility from Vienna
18th-century House of Habsburg
Governors of the Habsburg Netherlands
Austrian princesses
House of Lorraine
Burials at the Imperial Crypt
Burials at St. Stephen's Cathedral, Vienna
18th-century women rulers
Austrian people of the War of the Austrian Succession
Daughters of emperors
Daughters of kings
Female governors-general